Shawn Higbee (born 1970 in Jamestown, New York) is an American professional motorcycle racer in the AMA Daytona and Superbike Series.  He also races with the Willow Springs Motorcycle Club (Rosamond, CA).

Currently riding as a privateer (a self-financed racer), he rides both the Daytona and Superbike classes on the same, near-stock Buell 1125R.

Racing accomplishments  
1994 - AMA Harley-Davidson Twinsport Champion

1996 - 4th in AMA Superbike at Pomona, CA

1997- NASB Buell Lightning Champion, 3rd in Macau International GP

2001 Formula USA Unlimited Superbike Champion

2003 - 6th in AMA Superbike series.

References

American motorcycle racers
Living people
1970 births
Sportspeople from Jamestown, New York